The Healthcare in Kazakhstan is a post-Soviet healthcare system under reform.  The World Health Organization (WHO), in 2000, ranked the Kazakhstani healthcare system as the 64th in overall performance, and 135th by overall level of health (among 191 member nations included in the study).

Salamatty Kazakhstan is the State Healthcare Development Programme.

The Human Rights Measurement Initiative finds that Kazakhstan is fulfilling 79.7% of what it should be fulfilling for the right to health based on its level of income. When looking at the right to health with respect to children, Kazakhstan achieves 96.1% of what is expected based on its current income. In regards to the right to health amongst the adult population, the country achieves only 80.9% of what is expected based on the nation's level of income. Kazakhstan falls into the "very bad" category when evaluating the right to reproductive health because the nation is fulfilling only 62.1% of what the nation is expected to achieve based on the resources (income) it has available.

History
The quality of healthcare, which remained entirely under state control in 2006, declined in the post-Soviet era because of insufficient funding and the loss of technical experts through emigration. Between 1989 and 2001, the ratio of doctors per 10,000 inhabitants fell by 15% , to 34.6, and the ratio of hospital beds per 10,000 inhabitants fell by 46%, to 74. By 2005 those indicators had recovered somewhat, to 55 and 77, respectively. Since 1991, health care has consistently lacked adequate government funding; in 2005 only 2.5% of gross domestic product went for that purpose. A government health reform program aimed to increase that figure to 4% in 2010. A compulsory health insurance system has been in the planning stages for several years. Wages for health workers are extremely low, and equipment is in critically short supply. The main foreign source of medical equipment is Japan. Because of cost, the emphasis of treatment increasingly is on outpatient care instead of the hospital care preferred under the Soviet system. The health system is in crisis in rural areas such as the Aral Sea region, where health is most affected by pollution.

The most common diseases are respiratory infections, cardiovascular conditions, and tuberculosis. Since 2000, the incidence of human immunodeficiency virus (HIV) has increased, as has the incidence of environment-linked cancers. In 2003 an estimated 23,000 citizens had HIV. Because of increasing numbers of people in high-risk categories, such as female sex workers and intravenous narcotics users, experts forecast an increase in that figure. In 2003 an estimated 80 percent of cases were narcotics-related. In 2006 an outbreak of juvenile HIV caused by improper hospital techniques gained national attention. In the first nine months of 2006, some 1,285 new cases were reported officially.

37 mothers died per 100,000 live births in 2009. The maternal mortality rate had gone down slightly in comparison to 2008.

Officials reported very high numbers for suicides in Kazakhstan.

Healthcare System
Healthcare in Kazakhstan is provided by a network of primary, secondary and tertiary care facilities. Healthcare facilities are largely owned and operated by the public sector represented by the Ministry of Health. Health insurance is now primarily provided by the government in the public sector.

Providers
Healthcare providers in Kazakhstan encompass individual healthcare personnel, healthcare facilities and medical products.

Facilities
The public hospitals share of total hospital capacity has remained relatively stable (about 70%) for decades.  There are also privately owned for-profit hospitals as well as government hospitals in some locations, mainly owned by county and city governments.

There is a nationwide system of government-owned medical facilities open to the general public. The national Department of Defense operates field hospitals as well as permanent hospitals (the Military Health System), to provide military-funded care to active military personnel.

Hospitals provide some outpatient care in their emergency rooms and specialty clinics, but primarily exist to provide inpatient care. Hospital emergency departments and urgent care centers are sources of sporadic problem-focused care. Hospice services for the terminally ill who are expected to live six months or less are most commonly subsidized by charities and government. Prenatal, family planning care is government-funded obstetric and gynaecological specialty and provided in primary care facilities, and are usually staffed by nurse practitioners (midwives).

A big share of medical health care is delivered through a vast network of primary care facilities called ambulatories and policlinics.

Hospitals

Hospitals in Kazakhstan include the following:
Almaty Emergency Hospital
Children's Hospital in Almaty

Ministry of Health
The Ministry of Health of Kazakhstan is one of executive branches in Kazakh government to control, regulate and organize the delivery of social services in public health and medical care. One of the office head was Salidat Kayirbekova.

Medical Universities 
 UIB, International Medical School Almaty
 Kazakh National Medical University
 Karaganda State Medical University
 Astana Medical University
Semey Medical University
South Kazakhstan medical academy

National Medical Holding

National Medical Holding is an experimental health system located in capital city Nur-Sultan. Its purpose is to be "medical cluster", so new health technologies could be acquired, developed and disseminated across the nation. It comprises several hospitals under centralized management, and as of 2012 is subordinated to Nazarbayev University.

List of National Medical Holding's subsidiaries

Non-governmental organizations

Multiple domestic and international health NGOs conduct their work in Kazakhstan. The World Health Organization has a country office in Nur-Sultan and works with the Ministry of Healthcare and healthcare providers on initiatives for treatment, prevention and education.

Quality of Care in Kazakhstan 

Enacted in 2010, new Code of Health proposed several changes in existing procedures in healthcare quality assurance.

External links
Ministry of Healthcare and Social Development Kazakhstan
 Kazakhstan Health & Prosperity

References